Vila Guilherme is a district located in the north of São Paulo. 

Districts of São Paulo